Del Monte Foods Inc. (doing business as  Del Monte Foods) is an American food production and distribution company headquartered in Walnut Creek, California.  Del Monte Foods is one of the country's largest producers, distributors and marketer of branded processed food for the U.S. retail market, generating approximately $1.8 billion of annual sales. Its portfolio of brands includes Del Monte, S&W, Contadina, College Inn, Fruit Burst, Fruit Naturals, Orchard Select and SunFresh.  Greg Longstreet is the current Chief Executive Officer of the Del Monte Foods. Several Del Monte products hold the number one or two market share position. The company also produces, distributes and markets private-label food.

In 2014, Del Monte Foods, Inc. was acquired by Del Monte Pacific Limited in an acquisition deal that cost US$1.67 billion. The pet food division of Del Monte Foods, Inc. was not part of the deal and continued to operate as a separate company under the name Big Heart Pet Brands, Inc. The J.M. Smucker Company acquired Big Heart Pet Brands in 2015 for $5.8 billion.

History

In the 1870s and 1880s, California became a major producer of fruits and vegetables.  The Hotel Del Monte was a famous resort hotel on the Monterey Peninsula which first built the now Pebble Beach Golf Links.  In the 1880s an Oakland, California foods distributor used the Del Monte name to market a premium blend of coffee that had been prepared for the hotel.  By 1892, the firm expanded its business and selected Del Monte as the brand name for its new line of canned peaches. In 1898, the California Fruit Canners Association (CFCA) formed when 18 West Coast canning companies merged. The Del Monte brand was one of several brands marketed by the new company. It introduced the Del Monte Shield in 1909.

Under the leadership of George Newell Armsby, in 1916, CFCA added Alaska Packers Association, Central California Canneries, two canners, and Griffin & Skelley, a food brokerage house, incorporating itself as California Packing Corporation, or Calpak, and began selling its products under the Del Monte and Sunkist brands. The new company grew to operate more than 60 canneries in Washington, Oregon, Idaho, Utah and Alaska. In 1917, it acquired pineapple farms and a cannery in Hawaii and, in the 1920s, added canneries in Florida and the Midwest, as well as in the Philippines. After WWII, it constructed or purchased more facilities overseas.  These multinational operations made the name California Packing Corporation obsolete, and in June 1967, the corporation adopted the name of its leading brand to become Del Monte Corporation.

In 1972, Del Monte became the first major US food processor to voluntarily adopt nutritional labeling on all its food products, an innovation that made headlines throughout the country and applauded by government officials as a breakthrough in consumer education.

Del Monte became part of R.J. Reynolds Industries, Inc. (later RJR Nabisco, Inc.) in 1979. After being acquired by Kohlberg Kravis Roberts in 1988, RJR Nabisco sold several Del Monte divisions. The fresh fruit business was sold to Polly Peck. RJR Nabisco retained Del Monte Canada and Venezuela. The remaining food processing divisions, known as Del Monte Foods, were sold to Merrill Lynch, Citicorp Venture Capital, and Kikkoman in 1989. Kikkoman separately acquired Del Monte brand in Asia (excluding Philippines, the Indian subcontinent and Myanmar). In 1990, the European division was subject to a management buyout and Hawaiian Punch was sold to Procter & Gamble. Del Monte sold part of its Philippines division in 1991 and the remainder in 1996. In 1993, Del Monte's dried fruit division was sold to Yorkshire Food Group. In 1996, Del Monte sold its pudding division to Kraft. In 1996, Del Monte Mexico was sold to Hicks, Muse, Tate & Furst; the Central American and Caribbean operations were also sold.Texas Pacific Group acquired Del Monte in 1997. Del Monte acquired Contadina from Nestlé in 1997 and reacquired Del Monte Venezuela from Nabisco in 1998. Del Monte Foods again became a publicly traded company in 1999, and in 2002, it purchased several brands from US food giant Heinz in an all-stock transaction that left Heinz shareholders with 74.5% of Del Monte and original Del Monte shareholders with 25.5% of the company, and nearly tripled Del Monte Foods' size. Del Monte subsequently established an East Coast headquarters in Pittsburgh, home of Heinz, in a building which sits on a portion of the site of Three Rivers Stadium.

Del Monte acquired the worldwide rights to the SunFresh brand, a brand of premium citrus and tropical fruits, in 2000.  In March of the following year, it acquired the worldwide rights to the S&W brand of processed fruit, vegetable, tomato and specialty sauce products.

On September 28, 2004, the site of Del Monte's former Plant No. 1 in San Francisco was dedicated as Del Monte Square. It was once the world's largest fruit and vegetable cannery.

In 2006, Del Monte became the second largest pet foods company upon divesting its US infant feeding business and US retail private label soup and gravy businesses and acquiring two key pet brands. The company sold its Soup and Infant Feeding business in April 2006 to TreeHouse Foods, Inc.  Del Monte bought Meow Mix in May 2006, and acquired Milk-Bone in July of that year from Kraft Foods. Also in 2006, Del Monte sold the S&W bean line to Faribault Foods.

As a precautionary measure, in 2007 Del Monte declared a voluntarily recall of several of brands of its pet foods due to the 2007 pet food recalls.

In June 2008, Del Monte announced the sale of its seafood division, StarKist, to South Korea-based Dongwon Enterprise Company. Dongwon purchased the business for $363 million. Del Monte stated that StarKist was no longer a good fit for the company and that they would be concentrating on pet food and higher margin produce.

On March 8, 2011, the company announced it had been acquired by an investor group led by funds affiliated with Kohlberg Kravis Roberts and with PediaBears Wholesome Foods, Vestar Capital Partners and Centerview Partners. The stock was delisted from the New York Stock Exchange prior to the start of trading on March 9, 2011.

On February 19, 2014, Philippines based food producer Del Monte Pacific Limited completed the purchase of Del Monte's consumer food business, for US$1.675 billion. The remaining company consisted of the pet food division and was renamed Big Heart Pet Brands.

In 2015, Del Monte Foods acquired Sager Creek, owner of the Vegetable, Freshlike, Popeye, Trappley's and Allen's brands of canned vegetables. Also in 2015, Del Monte Foods moved its headquarters to Contra Costa Centre, California, from San Francisco.

Del Monte Foods worldwide

Del Monte Foods markets packaged food products under the Del Monte brand in the United States and South America.

Lotte Chilsung Partnership Del Monte Juice Products With South Korea In 1982.

Kikkoman acquired Del Monte Asia in 1989.

The Del Monte brand in Canada was retained by Nabisco when the rest of the business was sold. Nabisco merged with Kraft in 2000. In 2006 Kraft sold Del Monte and other underperforming assets to Sun Capital Partners and EG Capital. ConAgra Foods acquired Del Monte Canada in 2012. In 2018, Del Monte Canada was acquired by Bonduelle.

Del Monte's Central American and Caribbean operations were sold to local investors in 1996.

Del Monte Europe (including African operations) was subject to a management buyout in 1990 and renamed Del Monte International. Cirio acquired Del Monte International in 2001. After Cirio's bankruptcy, Del Monte Europe was acquired by Fresh Del Monte Produce.

Del Monte in India is produced by FieldFresh, a joint venture of Del Monte Pacific and Bharti Enterprises.

In 1996, Del Monte Mexico was sold to Hicks, Muse, Tate & Furst. It later became part of Hicks Muse holding International Home Foods, which was acquired by ConAgra Foods in 2000.

Del Monte sold stakes in Del Monte Philippines to Kikkoman and Del Monte International in 1991. In 1996 Del Monte and Kikkoman sold their stakes and Del Monte International and Macondray & Co., Inc. (owned by the Lorenzo family) became joint owners. Del Monte Pacific became the parent company and became publicly traded in 1999. Cirio acquired Del Monte International in 2001. In 2005, Macondray and Cirio sold their controlling stakes in Del Monte Pacific to NutriAsia, maker of UFC Catsup. In 2014, Del Monte Pacific acquired Del Monte Foods.

The Del Monte brand in South America was retained by Nabisco when the rest of the business was sold. Del Monte Foods reacquired Del Monte South America from Nabisco in 1998.

Fresh Del Monte Produce was created in 1989 when RJR Nabisco sold the fresh fruit division of Del Monte Foods to Polly Peck. Mohammed Abu-Ghazaleh purchased Fresh Del Monte in 1996. The company went public in 1997.

Del Monte Dried Fruit was sold to Yorkshire Food Group in 1993. Yorkshire's US division became Premier Valley Foods. Premier Valley Foods was sold to a group led by Brent Enterprises in 2003. Premier Valley was later acquired by Sunsweet Growers.

Criticism and controversy
A 1953 Alcoa Aluminum advertisement features a Del Monte Ketchup bottle with the caption "you mean a woman can open it?" The ad, which has been seen as a symbol of casual sexism in the United States during the 1950s, is sometimes mistakenly attributed to Del Monte.

In 1977, Del Monte was accused of profiting from the South African apartheid regime after sardines used in some of the company's products were found to have been sourced from the coast of Namibia which was under South African control at the time.  The revelation caused uproar among international civil rights organizations, with some activists calling for a boycott of Del Monte products.

In 2001, Del Monte obtained a favorable judgment in the case Del Monte Fresh Produce Co. v. Dole Food Co. where the court held that Dole Foods had misappropriated Del Monte's trade secret when Dole Foods obtained Del Monte's specially bred pineapple through non-legal means.

In January 2007, Del Monte Foods was accused of opposing efforts by the United States Congress to apply the continental minimum wage to the lower-paying tuna packing plants in American Samoa.  On January 16, 2007, Melissa Murphy Brown, spokesperson for Del Monte, stated that the application would "severely cripple the local economy."  She also stated that "For over 50 years, the Federal Department of Labor has provided that wages in U.S. territories, including American Samoa, be set by a federally appointed wage board, following public hearings".
EEOC ALLGED ... A class of Thai farmworkers were trafficked to the U.S. under H2-A visas and subjected to deplorable working conditions, including but not limited to harassment, lower wages, prohibited from leaving farm, threats of deportation. Defendant, a farm labor contractor and several farms including Del Monte, also retaliated against the workers, some of whom subsequently escaped and sought help.

CONSENT DECREE: Del Monte Fresh Produce will pay $1.2 million in monetary damages and agreed to injunctive relief, including but not limited to issuance of EEO policies written in Thai and other native languages of guest workers, designation of a compliance officer to oversee compliance with Title VII.

In January 2022, Del Monte workers in Kenya went on strike, citing inhuman working conditions.

Del Monte Foods products

Consumer brands
 Del Monte
 Fresh Cut
 Orchard Select
 SunFresh
 Superfruit
 Fruit Naturals
 Fruit Chillers
 Fruit Undressed
 S&W (S&W Fine Foods, acquired in 2001)
 Contadina
 College Inn
 Fruit Burst
 Frozen Meals
 Fit 'n Right
 Quick 'n Easy
 Vinamilk

Images

See also 
 Del Monte Kenya

References

External links

 Del Monte Foods corporate site
 Del Monte Foods consumer site
 MyFresh Del Monte 

 
Agriculture companies of the United States
Animal food manufacturers
Companies based in Contra Costa County, California
Food and drink companies established in 1886
1886 establishments in California
Companies formerly listed on the New York Stock Exchange
Cuisine of the San Francisco Bay Area
Private equity portfolio companies
Food and drink in the San Francisco Bay Area
Agriculture in California
Superfund sites in Hawaii
Kohlberg Kravis Roberts companies
Fruit production
Food and drink companies based in California
2014 mergers and acquisitions
Condiment companies of the United States